Amia ocellicauda is a species of primitive bony fish native to North America. Originally described by John Richardson from Lake Huron in 1836, it was synonymized with Amia calva until genetic work in 2022 revealed them to be separate species. This species ranges from around the Great Lakes south to the Gulf Coast wetlands of Louisiana and Texas. It is absent from the southeast, where its sister species Amia calva is found instead.

It differs from Amia calva by having fewer dentary teeth (only 15 compared to 16 or 17 of A. calva) and its interopercle membrane bone being smaller. It also has a more pronounced eyespot, has a longer body, and males have green coloration during the breeding season. The two species split approximately 1 to 2.5 million years ago during the mid-Pliocene. It is hypothesized that there are still several more undescribed species of Amia to be described. The vernacular name eyetail bowfin, was proposed by Brownstein et al.

References 

Amiiformes
Fish of North America
Freshwater fish of North America
Fish of the Great Lakes
Fish described in 1836